Peter Davies may refer to:
 Peter Llewelyn Davies (1897–1960), British publisher, basis for the character of Peter Pan
 Peter Davies (rugby) (1925–2014), Welsh rugby player
 Peter Davies (economic historian) (1927–2020), British economic historian
 Peter Maxwell Davies (1934–2016), British composer and conductor
 Peter Ronald Davies (born 1938), British Army general
 Peter Davies (politician) (born 1948), British politician, former mayor of Doncaster
 Peter Davies (scientist) (1948–2020), medical researcher
 Peter Davies (born 1956), British participant in the Up Series documentaries
 Peter Davies (Australian cricketer) (1957–2018), Australian cricketer
 Peter Ho Davies (born 1966), British writer
 Peter Davies (artist) (born 1970), Scottish painter
 Peter Davies (English cricketer) (born 1976), English cricketer
 Peter Davies (footballer, born 1936), Welsh footballer
 Peter Davies (footballer, born 1942), Welsh footballer
 Peter Davies (journalist) (active 1996–2011), South African journalist
 Peter Davies (horse), thoroughbred racehorse
 Peter J. Davies (born 1940), professor of plant physiology
 Pete Davies, English author
 Troy Davies (Peter Davies, 1960–2007), Australian artist and musician

See also
Peter Davis (disambiguation)